Minnesota's 8th congressional district covers the northeastern part of Minnesota. It is anchored by Duluth, the state's fifth-largest city. It also includes most of the Mesabi & Vermilion iron ranges, and the Boundary Waters Canoe Area in the Superior National Forest. The district is best known for its mining, agriculture, tourism, and shipping industries.

For many decades, the district reliably voted Democratic, but in 2016, Republicans made strong gains and Donald Trump carried the district by a 15-point margin. In the 2018 midterm election, it was one of only three congressional districts in the country which flipped to Republican. The eastern part of the district (Carlton, Cook, Lake, and St. Louis counties) tends to vote Democratic while the rest of the district leans Republican.

The district is represented by Republican Pete Stauber.

The district is notable for being the last one assigned after both the 2010 and 2020 censuses. After the 2020 census in particular, in spite of early predictions that it would be eliminated, Minnesota held onto the district by a mere 89 people, beating out New York's 27th district for the last spot.

Demographics

Sex 
 Male 50.5% 
 Female 49.5%

Ethnicity 
Minnesota's 8th district has one of the highest proportions of non-Hispanic whites in the nation. 98.4% of people over the age of 85 are non-Hispanic whites. 86% of those in the 0-4 year old bracket are non-Hispanic white, compared to less than 50% of the nation at large.

 White 92.1%
 Hispanic 1.6%
 Black 1.0%
 Asian 0.7%
 More than one race 2.0%
 Other race 2.6%

Ancestry 
The ancestry of Minnesota's 8th district is dominated by Northern Europeans: German Americans, Norwegian Americans, Swedish Americans, and Danish Americans make up over 55% of the population. Minnesota's 8th district has the highest percentage of Swedish Americans of any congressional district in the country.

 American	3.46%
 Arab	0.18%
 Czech	1.44%
 Danish	1.12%
 Dutch	1.51%
 English	5.91%
 French (except Basque)	3.62%
 French Canadian	1.60%
 German	29.47%
 Greek	0.12%
 Hungarian	0.24%
 Irish	9.09%
 Italian	2.91%
 Lithuanian	0.05%
 Norwegian	14.18%
 Polish	0.02%
 Portuguese	0.36%
 Russian	0.36%
 Scotch-Irish	0.47%
 Scottish	1.12%
 Slovak	0.08%
 Subsaharan African	0.45%
 Swedish	11.19%
 Swiss	0.30%
 Ukrainian	0.27%
 Welsh	0.34%
 West Indian	0.08%

Place of birth 
 Born in United States	97.8%
 State of residence	78.5%
 Different state	19.1%
 Born in Puerto Rico, U.S. Island areas, or born abroad to American parent(s)	0.4%
 Foreign born	1.9%

Language

Language spoken at home other than English 
 Spanish 1.0%
 German 0.4%
 Native American languages 0.4%
 French 0.1%
 Chinese 0.1%

List of members representing the district

Recent elections

Election results from statewide races

Historical district boundaries

See also

Minnesota's congressional districts
List of United States congressional districts

References

08